is a leading English trusts law case concerning the circumstances under which a resulting trust arises. It held that such a trust must be intended, or must be able to be presumed to have been intended. In the view of the majority of the House of Lords, presumed intention to reflect what is conscionable underlies all resulting and constructive trusts.

The decision was arguably the most significant of all of the local authorities swaps litigation cases.

Facts

The Westdeutsche Landesbank Girozentrale sued Islington LBC for the return of £1,145,525, which included compound interest, as money that it had paid under an interest rate swap agreement with the council. Interest rate swap agreements had been declared by the House of Lords, a few years earlier in Hazell v Hammersmith and Fulham LBC, to be ultra vires and void because they exceeded councils' borrowing powers under the Local Government Act 1972. The council accepted that it should repay the money it had received under the void contract, but that it should only repay simple interest. Previously, the courts had only allowed awards of compound interest if the claimant could establish a property right (though this was later reversed in Sempra Metals Ltd v IRC).

Accordingly, Westdeutsche argued that when it paid over the money a resulting trust arose immediately, because the bank plainly did not intend to make a gift. Among the arguments, counsel for the bank submitted that a resulting trust arose on all unjust enrichment claims, which this was, given that the basis for the initial contract had failed. The council contended that on traditional trust law principles there could be no resulting trust (and therefore no property right, and compound interest) because the council's conscience could not be affected when it could not know (before the judgment in Hazell) that the contract was void. A resulting trust needed to be linked to a deemed intention of the parties that money be held on trust, but there was none because the bank had intended the money to pass under a valid swap agreement (even though it did not turn out that way). It followed that compound interest could only begin accruing from the later date of the council's conscience being affected.

On the 18 February 1993, Hobhouse J held at first instance the bank could recover the money because the council had been unjustly enriched at the bank's expense, and could recover compound interest. Hazell v Hammersmith and Fulham LBC was considered and Sinclair v Brougham was applied. On the 17 December 1993, the Court of Appeal, with Dillon LJ, Leggatt LJ and Kennedy LJ, upheld the High Court, with Andrew Burrows acting for Islington LBC, and Jonathan Sumption QC for Westdeutsche. The council appealed.

Judgment

The House of Lords by a majority (Lord Browne-Wilkinson, Lord Slynn and Lord Lloyd) held that Westdeutsche bank could only recover its money with simple interest because it only had a personal claim for recovery in a common law action of money had and received. But the bank had no proprietary equitable claim under a resulting trust. There was no resulting trust because it was necessary that the council's conscience had been affected when it received the money, by knowledge that the transaction had been ultra vires and void. Consequently, it was necessary that there would be an "intention" that the money be held on trust, but this was not possible because nobody knew that the transaction would turn out to be void until the House of Lords' decision in Hazell v Hammersmith and Fulham LBC in 1991. In his Lordship's view all resulting trusts (even those described by Megarry J as "automatic" in Re Vandervell's Trusts (No 2)) depended on intention and were not connected with the law of unjust enrichment. It followed that no trust arose, and there was only a personal claim for the money back. This meant, said the majority, that only simple interest, and not compound interest was payable (a controversial decision that was overturned in Sempra Metals Ltd v IRC).

The two dissenting judges, Lord Goff and Lord Woolf, also thought that there should be no resulting trust of the money because if a proprietary claim were available, in other cases like this it would have an unfair impact on other creditors of an insolvent debtor, and similarly because it could potentially be unfair if assets could be traced. However, they would have held that compound interest should be available on personal claims. Lord Goff, however, expressly did not enter into a discussion of the points about unjust enrichment that went beyond the scope of the present case. Lord Woolf quoted De Havilland v Bowerbank where Lord Mansfield CJ stated, "that though by the common law, book debts do not of course carry interest, it may be payable in consequence of the usage of particular branches of trade; or of a special agreement". There was no reason why compound interest should not be awarded if it was ordinary commercial practice.

Lord Goff gave his judgment first, agreeing that there was no resulting trust for different reasons, but in dissent arguing that compound interest should be awarded on personal claims.

{{Cquote|
(2) A proprietary claim in restitution

I have already stated that restitution in these cases can be achieved by means of a personal claim in restitution. The question has however arisen whether the Bank should also have the benefit of an equitable proprietary claim in the form of a resulting trust. The immediate reaction must be - why should it? Take the present case. The parties have entered into commercial transaction. The transaction has, for technical reasons, been held to be void from the beginning. Each party is entitled to recover its money, with the result that the balance must be repaid. But why should the plaintiff Bank be given the additional benefits which flow from a proprietary claim, for example the benefit of achieving priority in the event of the defendant's insolvency? After all, it has entered into a commercial transaction, and so taken the risk of the defendant's insolvency, just like the defendant's other creditors who have contracted with it, not to mention other creditors to whom the defendant may be liable to pay damages in tort.

I feel bound to say that I would not at first sight have thought that an equitable proprietary claim in the form of a trust should be made available to the Bank in the present case, but for two things. The first is the decision of this House in Sinclair v Brougham [1914] AC 398, which appears to provide authority that a resulting trust may indeed arise in a case such as the present. The second is that on the authorities there is an equitable jurisdiction to award the plaintiff compound interest in cases where the defendant is a trustee. It is the combination of those two factors which has provided the foundation for the principal arguments advanced on behalf of the Bank in support of its submission that it was entitled to an award of compound
interest.

[... Lord Goff considered points about compound interest, suggesting there was no particular reason why compound interest should not be awarded for personal claims. He then continued on the issue of proprietary restitution...]

In a most interesting and challenging paper published in Equity: Contemporary Legal Developments (1992 ed. Goldstein). Professor Birks has argued for a wider role for the resulting trust in the field of restitution, and specifically for its availability in cases of mistake and failure of consideration. His thesis is avowedly experimental, written to test the temperature or the water. I feel bound to respond that the temperature of the water must be regarded as decidedly cold: see. e.g., Professor Burrows in [1995] RLR 15. and Mr. W.J. Swadling in (1996) 16 Legal Studies 133.

In the first place, as Lord Browne-Wilkinson points out, to impose a resulting trust in such cases is inconsistent with the traditional principles of trust law. For on receipt of the money by the payee it is to be presumed that (as in the present case) the identity of the money is immediately lost by mixing with other assets of the payee, and at that time the payee has no knowledge of the facts giving rise to the failure of consideration. By the time that those facts come to light, and the conscience of the payee may thereby be affected, there will therefore be no identifiable fund to which a trust can attach. But there are other difficulties. First, there is no general rule that the property in money paid under a void contract does not pass to the payee: and it is difficult to escape the conclusion that, as a general rule, the beneficial interest to the money likewise passes to the payee. This must certainly be the case where the consideration for the payment fails after the payment is made, as in cases of frustration or breach of contract: and there appears to be no good reason why the same should not apply in cases where, as in the present case, the contract under which the payment is made is void ab initio and the consideration for the payment therefore fails at the time of payment. It is true that the doctrine of mistake might be invoked where the mistake is fundamental in the orthodox sense of that word. But that is not the position in the present case: moreover the mistake in the present case must be classified as a mistake of law which, as at the law at present stands, creates its own special problems. No doubt that much-criticised doctrine will fall to be reconsidered when an appropriate case occurs: but I cannot think that the present is such a case, since not only has the point not been argued but (as will appear) it is my opinion that there is any event jurisdiction to award compound interest in the present case. For all of these reasons I conclude, in agreement with my noble and learned friend, that there is no basis for holding that a resulting trust arises in cases where money has been paid under a contract which is ultra vires and therefore void ab initio. This conclusion has the effect that all the practical problems which would flow from the imposition of a resulting trust in a case such as the present, in particular the imposition upon the recipient of the normal duties of trustee, do not arise. The dramatic consequences which would occur are detailed by Professor Burrows in his article on 'Swaps and the Friction between Common Law and Equity' in [1995] RLR 15, 27: the duty to account for profits accruing from the trust property; the inability of the payee to rely upon the defence of change of position: the absence of any limitation period: and so on. Professor Burrows even goes so far as to conclude that the action for money had and received would be rendered otiose in such cases, and indeed in all cases where the payer seeks restitution of mistaken payments. However, if no resulting trust arises, it also follows that the payer in a case such as the present cannot achieve priority over the payee's general creditors in the event of his insolvency - a conclusion which appears to me to be just.

For all these reasons I conclude that there is no basis for imposing a resulting trust in the present case, and I therefore reject the Bank's submission that it was here entitled to proceed by way of an equitable proprietary claim. I need only add that, in reaching that conclusion, I do not find it necessary to review the decision of Goulding J. in Chase Manhattan Bank NA v Israel-British Bank (London) Ltd [1981] Ch 105.}}

Lord Browne-Wilkinson's judgment, agreed with by the majority, followed.

Lord Slynn gave a short opinion concurring with Lord Browne-Wilkinson. Lord Woolf concurred with Lord Goff. Lord Lloyd concurred with Lord-Browne-Wilkinson.

SignificanceWestdeutsche has on its facts been superseded by Sempra Metals Ltd v Inland Revenue Commissioners, where the House of Lords held that the courts could award compound interest in a restitutionary claim at common law. In Westdeutsche it was conceded that compound interest could not be awarded at common law, and the case was argued to fall within resulting trust principles. However, the bank's claim could now have succeeded without recourse to establishing a resulting trust. In this respect, on what circumstances give rise to a resulting trust, however, Westdeutsche is still the leading case. Note Sempra Metals Ltd has recently been overturned by Prudential Assurance.

However, while remaining the leading case on the circumstances under which a resulting trust will arise, and thus a proprietary remedy is available, Westdeutsche'' has been subjected to wide-ranging criticism, particularly from academic circles focused on unjust enrichment. This view, represented by Peter Birks and Robert Chambers, suggests that Lord-Browne Wilkinson was wrong to regard resulting trusts as responding to conscience, rather than the absence of any intention to benefit another person. Birks argued that a proprietary remedy need not necessarily follow, although Chambers regards it as possible.

See also

English trusts law
Local authorities swaps litigation

Notes

References
 

English trusts case law
English derivatives case law
House of Lords cases
1996 in case law
1996 in British law
1996 in London
History of the London Borough of Islington